Bastia Mondovì is a comune (municipality) in the Province of Cuneo in the Italian region Piedmont, located about  south of Turin and about  northeast of Cuneo.

Bastia Mondovì borders the following municipalities: Carrù, Cigliè, Clavesana, and Mondovì.

Demographic evolution

References

External links
 Official website

Cities and towns in Piedmont